More Than a Thousand was a Portuguese metalcore band that was started in 2001 by Vasco Ramos, Filipe Oliveira, Pedro Pais and Sérgio Sousa. In 2005 they moved to London in attempt to win a larger audience and lived there for four years but later returned to their hometown of Setúbal, Portugal. The band has released three full-length albums: Volume II: The Hollow (2006), Volume IV: Make Friends and Enemies (2010) and Volume V: Lost at Home (2014). The band sings in English. They were signed to Good Fight Records and eOne music, before going on hiatus in April 2016.

History

Early years (2001–2006)
More Than A Thousand was formed in Setúbal, Portugal in 2001. They moved to London in 2005 to reach a wider audience.

More Than A Thousand's debut album Volume II: The Hollow is a follow up to the EP Trailers Are Always More Exciting Than Movies, billed as '13 songs about loss, separation and human decay'. It is based on the band's experiences in the previous two tumultuous years. Volume II: The Hollow was recorded and produced in 2006 at Tonteknik studios in Umea, Sweden, under the supervision of Pelle Henricsson and Eskil Lovström, the team that had produced Refused, Poison the Well, Cult of Luna and Hell Is For Heroes.

The line-up in that time was rounded out by Vasco Ramos singer, Filipe Oliveira on guitar, Sergio Sousa on guitar, bass player Rui Buiça and drummer Jorge Felizardo. Vasco, Filipe and Sergio write and produce.

Volume 3: Mar (2007–2009)
In 2007, the band decided to release an EP for the fans, that was heavier, direct and with the same ambience present on Vol. II. After playing with Metallica and Mastodon in June, they started recording Vol. III: MAR in the Generator studio. The production was supervised by the Vasco and Filipe throughout summer, in Portugal. The mastering process took place in New York, by Alan Douches (Every Time I Die, Norma Jean, Converge). The band played at Eurosonic festival, in Groningen, January 2008.

In April 2009, they went to Baltimore, USA, to record the follow-up to Volume III. This time the production was supervised by Paul Leavitt (Gwen Stacy, All Time Low, I Am Ghost) along with Vasco and Filipe. The album was named Volume IV: Make Friends And Enemies and was released by Sony Music.

Volume V: Lost At Home (2014–present)
The band announced on 17 January 2014, that they had signed to Good Fight Records and EONE Music. This helped the band gain greater publicity within the United States, a market they had previously not reached.

Volume V: Lost at Home was released on 18 February in North America and 24 February in the United Kingdom and Europe.

On 12 January 2014, the band confirmed that they would join Chelsea Grin, The Browning, and Silent Screams on tour to promote the new album.

On 25 January 2014, the band released the first single off the album Fight Your Demons. The song became available on iTunes the same day.
On 28 February and 1 March, they played 2 main shows in Lisbon and Oporto respectively, with Bury Tomorrow and Cosmogon as opening acts following some dates in Europe before heading for a European tour as support for Chelsea Grin.

On 3 December 2014, they were added to the Betraying The Martyrs European tour in 2015, replacing the band Make Them Suffer. They will support Betraying The Martyrs along with Texas In July and Upon This Dawning. This tour will run from 30 January to 1 March and will visit 31 cities across Europe.

After 16 years together the band is going on a hiatus in April 2016.

Before disbanding the band is playing a farewell tour across parts of Europe, with support from Promethee and Hills Have Eyes.

Vocalist Vasco Ramos has since embarked on a solo project under the moniker "XANDE", stylistically influenced by artists such as The Weeknd and FKA twigs. XANDE released its debut EP "It Is What It Is" in 2018.

Members

Final lineup
 Vasco Ramos – lead vocals (2001–2016)
 Filipe Oliveira – rhythm guitar (2001–2016)
 Sergio Sousa – lead guitar (2001–2016)
 Wilson Silva – drums (2010–2016)
 Mike Ghost – bass guitar (2013–2016)

Former members
 Rui Buiça – Bass (2001-2007)
 André Viegas – vocals (2001–2005)
 Jorge Felizardo – drums
 Pedro Pais – drums
 Ricardo Sousa – bass guitar (2007–2009)
 Ricardo Cabrita (2009-2013)

Discography
 Those in Glass Houses Shouldn't Throw Stones (Demo) (2001)
 Too Many Teen Massacre Horror Movies (EP) (2004)
 Vol.1 Trailers Are Always More Exciting Than Movies (EP) (2004)
 Two Songs... An Endless Body Count (Demo) (2005)
 Vol.2 The Hollow (2006)
 Vol.3 Mar (EP) (2008)
 Vol.4 Make Friends and Enemies (2010)
 Vol.5 Lost at Home (2014)

References

External links
 MySpace page
 MTAT Tumblr

Metalcore musical groups
Portuguese musical groups